The 1st constituency of the Alpes Maritimes is a French legislative constituency in the Alpes Maritimes département.  It covers the centre-east of the city of Nice, and had 90,656 inhabitants at the last count.  The constituency's borders were re-drawn in 2010.

Historical Representation

Election results

2022

 
 
 
 
 
 
|-
| colspan="8" bgcolor="#E9E9E9"|
|-

2017

2012

|- style="background-color:#E9E9E9;text-align:center;"
! colspan="2" rowspan="2" style="text-align:left;" | Candidate
! rowspan="2" colspan="2" style="text-align:left;" | Party
! colspan="2" | 1st round
! colspan="2" | 2nd round
|- style="background-color:#E9E9E9;text-align:center;"
! width="75" | Votes
! width="30" | %
! width="75" | Votes
! width="30" | %
|-
| style="background-color:" |
| style="text-align:left;" | Eric Ciotti
| style="text-align:left;" | Union for a Popular Movement
| UMP
| 
| 43.89%
| 
| 60.73%
|-
| style="background-color:" |
| style="text-align:left;" | Patrick Allemand
| style="text-align:left;" | Socialist Party
| PS
| 
| 28.68%
| 
| 39.27%
|-
| style="background-color:" |
| style="text-align:left;" | Jacques Peyrat
| style="text-align:left;" | Other far-right
| EXD
| 
| 16.16%
| colspan="2" style="text-align:left;" |
|-
| style="background-color:" |
| style="text-align:left;" | Robert Injey
| style="text-align:left;" | Left Front
| FG
| 
| 4.58%
| colspan="2" style="text-align:left;" |
|-
| style="background-color:" |
| style="text-align:left;" | Christian Razeau
| style="text-align:left;" | Centre for France
| MoDem
| 
| 1.43%
| colspan="2" style="text-align:left;" |
|-
| style="background-color:" |
| style="text-align:left;" | Pierre Argentieri
| style="text-align:left;" | Miscellaneous Right
| DVD
| 
| 1.11%
| colspan="2" style="text-align:left;" |
|-
| style="background-color:" |
| style="text-align:left;" | Maryse Ullmann
| style="text-align:left;" | Ecologist
| ECO
| 
| 1.09%
| colspan="2" style="text-align:left;" |
|-
| style="background-color:" |
| style="text-align:left;" | Jean-Marc Governatori
| style="text-align:left;" | Ecologist
| ECO
| 
| 0.71%
| colspan="2" style="text-align:left;" |
|-
| style="background-color:" |
| style="text-align:left;" | Loïc Fortuit
| style="text-align:left;" | Far Left
| EXG
| 
| 0.67%
| colspan="2" style="text-align:left;" |
|-
| style="background-color:" |
| style="text-align:left;" | Jean-Paul Belhadi
| style="text-align:left;" | Miscellaneous right
| DVD
| 
| 0.53%
| colspan="2" style="text-align:left;" |
|-
| style="background-color:" |
| style="text-align:left;" | Michel Cotta
| style="text-align:left;" | Other far-right
| EXD
| 
| 0.47%
| colspan="2" style="text-align:left;" |
|-
| style="background-color:" |
| style="text-align:left;" | Christophe Ricerchi
| style="text-align:left;" | Far Left
| EXG
| 
| 0.30%
| colspan="2" style="text-align:left;" |
|-
| style="background-color:" |
| style="text-align:left;" | Agnès Benkemoun
| style="text-align:left;" | Far Left
| EXG
| 
| 0.19%
| colspan="2" style="text-align:left;" |
|-
| style="background-color:" |
| style="text-align:left;" | Alix Horsch Filippi
| style="text-align:left;" | Regionalist
| REG
| 
| 0.18%
| colspan="2" style="text-align:left;" |
|-
| style="background-color:" |
| style="text-align:left;" |
| style="text-align:left;" | Jean-Pierre Gastaud
| style="text-align:left;" | Other
| AUT
| 
| 0.04%
| colspan="2" style="text-align:left;" |
|-
| colspan="8" style="background-color:#E9E9E9;"|
|- style="font-weight:bold"
| colspan="4" style="text-align:left;" | Total
| 
| 100%
| 
| 100%
|-
| colspan="8" style="background-color:#E9E9E9;"|
|-
| colspan="4" style="text-align:left;" | Registered voters
| 
| style="background-color:#E9E9E9;"|
| 
| style="background-color:#E9E9E9;"|
|-
| colspan="4" style="text-align:left;" | Blank/Void ballots
| 
| 1.24%
| 
| 2.49%
|-
| colspan="4" style="text-align:left;" | Turnout
| 
| 55.92%
| 
| 52.64%
|-
| colspan="4" style="text-align:left;" | Abstentions
| 
| 44.08%
| 
| 47.36%
|-
| colspan="8" style="background-color:#E9E9E9;"|
|- style="font-weight:bold"
| colspan="6" style="text-align:left;" | Result
| colspan="2" style="background-color:" | UMP HOLD
|}

2007

|- style="background-color:#E9E9E9;text-align:center;"
! colspan="2" rowspan="2" style="text-align:left;" | Candidate
! rowspan="2" colspan="2" style="text-align:left;" | Party
! colspan="2" | 1st round
! colspan="2" | 2nd round
|- style="background-color:#E9E9E9;text-align:center;"
! width="75" | Votes
! width="30" | %
! width="75" | Votes
! width="30" | %
|-
| style="background-color:" |
| style="text-align:left;" | Eric Ciotti
| style="text-align:left;" | Union for a Popular Movement
| UMP
| 
| 44.56%
| 
| 60.92%
|-
| style="background-color:" |
| style="text-align:left;" | Patrick Allemand
| style="text-align:left;" | Socialist Party
| PS
| 
| 23.35%
| 
| 39.08%
|-
| style="background-color:" |
| style="text-align:left;" | Jérôme Rivière
| style="text-align:left;" | Miscellaneous Right
| DVD
| 
| 9.84%
| colspan="2" style="text-align:left;" |
|-
| style="background-color:" |
| style="text-align:left;" | Rémy Francois
| style="text-align:left;" | National Front
| FN
| 
| 5.87%
| colspan="2" style="text-align:left;" |
|-
| style="background-color:" |
| style="text-align:left;" | Hervé Cael
| style="text-align:left;" | Democratic Movement
| MoDem
| 
| 4.54%
| colspan="2" style="text-align:left;" |
|-
| style="background-color:" |
| style="text-align:left;" | Robert Injey
| style="text-align:left;" | Communist
| COM
| 
| 3.15%
| colspan="2" style="text-align:left;" |
|-
| style="background-color:" |
| style="text-align:left;" | Philippe Vardon
| style="text-align:left;" | Far Right
| EXD
| 
| 2.29%
| colspan="2" style="text-align:left;" |
|-
| style="background-color:" |
| style="text-align:left;" | Mounia Ferriere
| style="text-align:left;" | The Greens
| VEC
| 
| 1.41%
| colspan="2" style="text-align:left;" |
|-
| style="background-color:" |
| style="text-align:left;" | Michel Francois
| style="text-align:left;" | Ecologist
| ECO
| 
| 1.20%
| colspan="2" style="text-align:left;" |
|-
| style="background-color:" |
| style="text-align:left;" | Danielle Lisbona
| style="text-align:left;" | Miscellaneous Right
| DVD
| 
| 0.99%
| colspan="2" style="text-align:left;" |
|-
| style="background-color:" |
| style="text-align:left;" | Christophe Ricerchi
| style="text-align:left;" | Far Left
| EXG
| 
| 0.87%
| colspan="2" style="text-align:left;" |
|-
| style="background-color:" |
| style="text-align:left;" | Ambre Gomez
| style="text-align:left;" | Far Left
| EXG
| 
| 0.79%
| colspan="2" style="text-align:left;" |
|-
| style="background-color:" |
| style="text-align:left;" | Jean-Marc Governatori
| style="text-align:left;" | Divers
| DIV
| 
| 0.74%
| colspan="2" style="text-align:left;" |
|-
| style="background-color:" |
| style="text-align:left;" | Agnès Benkemoun
| style="text-align:left;" | Far Left
| EXG
| 
| 0.42%
| colspan="2" style="text-align:left;" |
|-
| colspan="8" style="background-color:#E9E9E9;"|
|- style="font-weight:bold"
| colspan="4" style="text-align:left;" | Total
| 
| 100%
| 
| 100%
|-
| colspan="8" style="background-color:#E9E9E9;"|
|-
| colspan="4" style="text-align:left;" | Registered voters
| 
| style="background-color:#E9E9E9;"|
| 
| style="background-color:#E9E9E9;"|
|-
| colspan="4" style="text-align:left;" | Blank/Void ballots
| 
| 1.13%
| 
| 2.58%
|-
| colspan="4" style="text-align:left;" | Turnout
| 
| 58.46%
| 
| 53.08%
|-
| colspan="4" style="text-align:left;" | Abstentions
| 
| 41.54%
| 
| 46.92%
|-
| colspan="8" style="background-color:#E9E9E9;"|
|- style="font-weight:bold"
| colspan="6" style="text-align:left;" | Result
| colspan="2" style="background-color:" | UMP HOLD
|}

2002

 
 
 
 
 
 
 
|-
| colspan="8" bgcolor="#E9E9E9"|
|-

1997

 
 
 
 
 
 
 
 
|-
| colspan="8" bgcolor="#E9E9E9"|
|-
 
 

 
 
 
 
 

*UDF dissident

Sources

 Official results of French elections from 1998: 

1